Alan Anthony Altshuler (born March 9, 1936, in Brooklyn) is an American educator and government official. Altshuler is the Ruth and Frank Stanton Professor in Urban Policy and Planning, Emeritus, at the Harvard University Graduate School of Design and the John F. Kennedy School of Government.

Career
Altshuler received a Bachelor of Arts from Cornell University and a Doctor of Philosophy from the University of Chicago.

Altshuler became the first director of the Boston Transportation Planning Review in 1970, and from 1971 through 1975, he served as the inaugural Massachusetts Secretary of Transportation. Since 1988, Altshuler has been director of the Taubman Center for State and Local Government, and until 1998, director of the Ford Foundation Program on Innovations in American Government.

Altshuler has taught at the Massachusetts Institute of Technology and Cornell University, as well as serving as dean at both the New York University Robert F. Wagner Graduate School of Public Service and the Harvard University Graduate School of Design. At Harvard, Altshuler also served as founding director of the Rappaport Institute for Greater Boston from 2000 to 2004.

Altshuler is a Fellow of the National Academy of Public Administration.

Works
The City Planning Process: A Political Analysis, 1970, 
Community Control: The Black Demand for Participation in Large American Cities, 1970, 
The Urban Transportation System: Politics and Policy Innovation, 1979, 
The Future of the Automobile: The Report of MIT's International Automobile Program, 1985, 
Regulation for Revenue: The Political Economy of Land Use Exactions, with Jose A. Gomez-Ibanez and Arnold M. Howitt, 1993, 
Governance and Opportunity in Metropolitan America, 1999, 
Mega-Projects: The Changing Politics of Urban Public Investment, with David Luberoff, 2003,

References

External links
 Harvard profile

1936 births
Living people
Cornell University alumni
University of Chicago alumni
Massachusetts Secretaries of Transportation
MIT School of Architecture and Planning faculty
Cornell University faculty
New York University faculty
Harvard Kennedy School faculty
Harvard Graduate School of Design faculty
Writers from Brooklyn